The 1995 Currie Cup (known as the Bankfin Currie Cup for sponsorship reasons) was the 57th season in the South African Currie Cup competition since it started in 1889.

Competition

Regular season and title playoffs
There were 6 participating teams in the 1995 Currie Cup. These teams played each other twice over the course of the season, once at home and once away.

Teams received two points for a win and one points for a draw.

The top two teams qualified for the final.

Teams

Changes from 1994
None.

Team Listing

Log

Matches
The following matches were played in the 1995 Currie Cup:

Round 1

Round 2

Round 3

Round 4

Round 5

Round 6

Round 7

Round 8

Round 9

Round 10

Round 11

Round 12

Final

External links
 Currie Cup Log 1995
 

 
1995 in South African rugby union
1995 rugby union tournaments for clubs